Eurico Rosa da Silva (born June 29, 1975, in Buri, São Paulo, Brazil) is a retired Thoroughbred racing jockey who raced for five years in his native Brazil and another four years in Macau before coming to Woodbine Racetrack in Toronto, Ontario. While based in Canada, he also won races in the United States.

Silva got his first Canadian Triple Crown win in 2009 when he rode Eye of the Leopard to victory in the Queen's Plate, and won that race again in 2010 aboard Big Red Mike. Among his other successes, in 2016 he won the Woodbine Oaks, riding Neshama. In 2017, he won the Canadian International Stakes riding Bullards Alley. In 2019, he won the Woodbine Mile with El Tormenta.

Eurico Rosa da Silva retired at the end of the 2019 racing season having won 2,286 races. Six times he was voted the Sovereign Award for Canada's Outstanding Jockey. He received the award for a seventh time in 2019.

For his significant contributions to the sport of Thoroughbred racing, Eurico Rosa da Silva was the 2021 recipient of the Avelino Gomez Memorial Award.

Autobiography
On December 1, 2020, Eurico Rosa da Silva's autobiography titled "Riding for Freedom" was published. The book, containing what TSN described as having "many shocking revelations," recounts his rise to the top levels of Thoroughbred racing while struggling with the effects of a verbally abusive and negligent father which had at times led him to the brink of taking his own life.

References

External links
 Eurico Rosa Da Silva's Personal website

Year-end charts

1975 births
Brazilian jockeys
Canadian jockeys
Sovereign Award winners
Avelino Gomez Memorial Award winners
Sportspeople from Oakville, Ontario
Brazilian emigrants to Canada
People from São Paulo (state)
Living people